Mother of George is a 2013 Nigerian drama film directed by Andrew Dosunmu and tells the story of a newly married Nigerian couple in Brooklyn who own and manage a small restaurant while struggling with fertility issues.  The film was produced by Patrick S. Cunningham and Rhea Scott.

The film premièred in the U.S. Dramatic Competition at the 2013 Sundance Film Festival. Cinematographer Bradford Young won Sundance 2013's Cinematography Award: U.S. Dramatic for his work on this film and Ain't Them Bodies Saints. Mother of George was also selected as the closing night film at the 2013 Maryland Film Festival.

The film has been acquired for U.S. distribution by Oscilloscope Laboratories.

Plot
The film opens with the wedding of a Nigerian couple, Ayodele (Issach de Bankolé) and Adenike (Danai Gurira) Balogun. Adenike is given fertility beads by her mother-in-law, Mama Ayo (Bukky Ajayi) and although the couple make love on their first night of marriage, Adenike struggles to become pregnant. Despite drinking a tea that is supposed to help with fertility, Adenike is still unable to conceive and faces growing pressure from Mama Ayo. A visit to the doctor reveals that Adenike can receive help on the issue, but Ayodele refuses to cooperate.

Sade (Yaya DaCosta) mentions adoption but Adenike insists that she wants to give birth to the child herself. Mama Ayo raises a controversial option: Adenike could conceive the child with Ayodele's brother, Biyi (Tony Okungbowa). Biyi initially refuses to participate in the scheme but eventually gives in. Following this Adenike becomes pregnant. Ayodele believes he is the father.

The guilt becomes too much for Adenike to bear, and she finally tells her husband the truth. Ayodele subsequently walks out of the marriage and confronts his mother. Adenike goes into labor, and the film concludes as Ayodele joins the others at the hospital.

Cast
 Isaach de Bankolé as Ayodele
 Danai Gurira as Adenike
 Bukky Ajayi as Ma Ayo
 Tony Okungbowa as Biyi
 Yaya DaCosta as Sade

Reception
The film received critical acclaim. On Rotten Tomatoes it has a 91% rating based on 45 reviews, with an average rating of 7.20 out of 10. The site consensus states "Director Andrew Dosunmu's style takes some getting used to, but Mother of George compensates with powerful acting, a thoughtful script, and gorgeous visuals." On Metacritic it has a score of 77% based on reviews from 21 critics.
It has been praised for its excellent camera work, setting, and plot, although the screenplay has received some criticism. It was listed as a New York Times Critics Pick.

References

External links
 
 
 

 

2013 films
American drama films
2013 drama films
Films set in the United States
Films shot in the United States
Films set in Brooklyn
Yoruba-language films
Nigerian drama films
Films directed by Andrew Dosunmu
English-language Nigerian films
2010s English-language films
2010s American films